"Fade to Grey" is a 1980 song by British new wave band Visage, released as the second single from their debut album, Visage (1980), on Polydor Records.

The song was the band's most successful single. It entered the singles charts in late 1980, peaking at no. 8 in the UK Singles Chart and reaching no. 1 in West Germany and Switzerland. Steve Strange was on lead vocals; the French lyrics were spoken by Rusty Egan's Belgian girlfriend Brigitte Arens.
	
The music video became one of the first videoclips that Kevin Godley and Lol Creme directed, before they became known for their works with the Police, Duran Duran and Herbie Hancock.

Background
 "Fade to Grey" was originally written as an instrumental by Billy Currie and Chris Payne. Payne came up with the bassline and the chords while Currie added the other parts. They worked on it during soundchecks on Gary Numan's 1979 tour. Cedric Sharpley, the drummer of Numan's backing band, was also heavily involved. In those days it was called "Toot City". Initially considered to be released as a Billy Currie and Chris Payne single, the track eventually became part of the Visage project. While setting the track listing of the Visage album, Midge Ure suggested the use of the melody and wrote the song's lyrics.

"Fade to Grey" was Visage's second single, but their first release on a major label, Polydor. It was released in 1980, on the same day as the band's debut album, Visage. "Fade to Grey" charted around Europe in late 1980/early 1981, becoming a Top 10 hit in the UK, a Top 5 hit in five countries, and no. 1 in West Germany and Switzerland. The song is sung in English and spoken in French.

A remix by Bassheads/Andy Stevenson was released in 1993 to promote the Fade to Grey – The Best of Visage compilation (an updated re-release of 1983's Fade to Grey – The Singles Collection). The new version became a modest Top 40 hit in the UK, peaking at no. 39.

In 2008, Strange appeared on the BBC series Ashes to Ashes performing the song in the Blitz nightclub.

In 2014, Visage released "Fade To Grey (Orchestral)", a new version of the song re-recorded with a symphony orchestra. This followed the band's appearance at the 2014 World Ski Jumping Championships in Prague, Czech Republic, where they played a ten-song set backed by the Czech Synthosymphonica Orchestra. The band also released an album, Orchestral, which featured several classic Visage songs rerecorded with the orchestra.

Authorship
The song features the same lyrics in two languages, English and French. The English lyrics are sung, whereas the French lyrics are spoken by a female voice. Steve Strange and Midge Ure both claimed to have been the one who came up with the idea for the French vocal in the track. On the finished track, the French vocal was performed by Brigitte Arens, a young student from Belgium who was Rusty Egan's girlfriend at the time. On the album, the song is credited to Billy Currie, Chris Payne and Midge Ure. In his 2002 autobiography, Strange said it was not fair to credit the song to Ure, Currie and Payne only, since his input was significant and he was "the focal point of the group".

Music video
Visage's first music video was for this song, and was directed by Godley & Creme. Appearing with Steve Strange in the video was his friend Julia Fodor, who mimed the French lyrics in the video. The clip was included on band's 1986 video release, Visage.

Track listings

7" single (1980)
A. "Fade to Grey" – 3:50
B. "The Steps" – 3:13

12" single (1980)
A. "Fade to Grey" – 3.50 (UK release) 6:17 (German release only)
B. "The Steps" – 3:13

12" single (1993)
A1. "Fade to Grey" (Bassheads Vocal Mix) – 7:11
A2. "Fade to Grey" (Bassheads Dub Mix) – 7:35
A3. "Fade to Grey" (Bassheads Trance Mix) – 7:28
B1. "Fade to Grey" (Original Mix) – 3:51
B2. "Fade to Grey" (Subliminal Mix) – 5:16
B3. "Fade to Grey" (12" Mix) – 8:06

CD maxi-single (1993)
"Fade to Grey" (Bassheads 7" Edit) – 3:22
"Fade to Grey" (7" Remix) – 3:37
"Fade to Grey" (Original 7" Mix) – 3:51
"Fade to Grey" (Wild Cat Mix) – 7:48

Orchestral version (2014)
Fade to Grey (Orchestral Version)
Fade to Grey (Main Version)
Fade to Grey (Extended Version)
Fade to Grey (Extended Instrumental)
Fade to Grey (Orchestral Instrumental)
Fade to Grey (Orchestral Radio Version)
Fade to Grey (Orcapella)

Charts

Weekly charts

Year-end charts

Certifications and sales

Cover versions

Mark 'Oh cover
German DJ Mark 'Oh covered "Fade to Grey" in 1996. His version reached no. 11 in Germany and was a Top 40 hit in Switzerland, Austria, Finland and the Netherlands.

Other cover versions
In 1994, the Italian electronic group Datura made a version of "Fade to Grey" with a re-recorded vocal track by Steve Strange singing lyrics specifically for this version. The single peaked at no. 5 in the Italian singles chart.

Influence
In the official U2 autobiography, U2 by U2, Bono claims that Adam Clayton was trying to work out how to play the bassline of "Fade to Grey" and his attempt became "New Year's Day", U2's first Top 10 single.
French DJ Vitalic depicts the song as "incredible" and "is an influence you can hear in my [his] music" in an interview for greenroom.fr

See also
List of number-one hits of 1981 (Germany)
List of number-one singles of the 1980s (Switzerland)

References

Bibliography

1980 songs
1980 singles
1993 singles
1994 singles
1996 singles
Macaronic songs
Music videos directed by Godley and Creme
Number-one singles in Germany
Number-one singles in Switzerland
Polydor Records singles
Songs written by Billy Currie
Songs written by Midge Ure
Visage (band) songs